Katrin Wehrheim (born 1974) is an associate professor of mathematics at the University of California, Berkeley. Their research centers around symplectic topology and gauge theory.  They are known for their work on pseudoholomorphic quilts. With Dusa McDuff, they have challenged the foundational rigor of a classic proof in symplectic geometry.

Education and career 
After attending school in Hamburg and studying at the University of Hamburg until 1995 and Imperial College until 1996, Wehrheim went to ETH Zürich for graduate studies. After almost dropping out to become an Olympic rower, Wehrheim completed their PhD in 2002, under the joint supervision of Dusa McDuff and Dietmar Salamon.

They were an instructor at Princeton University and member of the Institute for Advanced Study before taking a tenure track position at the Massachusetts Institute of Technology in 2005. While they were at MIT, Wehrheim—who is openly gay—co-headed the 2008 Celebration of Women in Mathematics conference and assisted the institute in a push to bring on students and postdoctoral researchers from diverse backgrounds. Since 2013, Wehrheim has been teaching mathematics at the University of California, Berkeley.

Awards and honors
Their PhD thesis in mathematics Anti-Self-Dual Instantons with Lagrangian Boundary Conditions won the 2002 ETH medal. In 2010 they received the Presidential Career Award PECASE from Barack Obama in a ceremony at the White House. In 2012 they became a fellow of the American Mathematical Society.

References

External links
Home page

1974 births
Living people
21st-century German mathematicians
German women mathematicians
University of Hamburg alumni
Alumni of Imperial College London
ETH Zurich alumni
Academic staff of ETH Zurich
University of California, Berkeley faculty
Princeton University faculty
Massachusetts Institute of Technology faculty
Fellows of the American Mathematical Society
21st-century women mathematicians
21st-century German women
LGBT mathematicians
German LGBT people